Dwain Alan Winter (born 28 March 1964) is a former English cricketer.  Winter was a left-handed batsman who bowled right-arm medium pace and who occasionally played as a wicketkeeper. He was born at Devizes, Wiltshire.

Winter made his Minor Counties Championship debut for Wiltshire in 1994 against Berkshire.  From 1994 to 2001, he represented the county in 45 Minor Counties Championship matches, the last of which came against Shropshire.  Winter also represented Wiltshire in the MCCA Knockout Trophy, making his debut in that competition came against Herefordshire in 1996.  From 1996 to 2001, he represented the county in 19 Trophy matches, the last of which came against the Gloucestershire Cricket Board.

Winter also represented Wiltshire in List A matches. His debut List A match came against the Northamptonshire Cricket Board in the 1999 NatWest Trophy. From 1999 to 2001, he represented the county in 5 List A matches, the last of which came against the Derbyshire Cricket Board in the 2001 Cheltenham & Gloucester Trophy.

References

External links
Dwain Winter at Cricinfo
Dwain Winter at CricketArchive

1964 births
Living people
People from Devizes
English cricketers
Wiltshire cricketers